Wiegert is a surname. Notable people with the surname include:

 Gerald Wiegert (1944–2021), American automobile designer and manufacturer
 Ingolf Wiegert (born 1957), East German handball player 
 Paul Wiegert (born 1967), Canadian astronomer
 Zach Wiegert (born 1972), American football player